The Jamestown Polish craftsmen's strike of 1619 took place in the settlement of Jamestown in the Virginia colony. It was the first documented strike in North America. Skilled craftsmen were sent by the Virginia Company to Jamestown to produce pitch, tar, and turpentine used for shipbuilding. When the colony held its first election in 1619, many settlers were not allowed to vote on the grounds that they were not of English descent, and they went on strike. Due to the importance of the skilled workers in producing valuable naval stores for the colony, company leaders bowed to labor pressure and gave full voting rights to continental workers.

History
John Smith first encountered and was impressed with the talents of Polish craftsmen when he traveled through Poland in 1602, fleeing the Turks who had enslaved him. The Polish–Lithuanian Commonwealth was then the largest kingdom of Europe, covering the present territory of Poland, Lithuania, Latvia, Estonia, Belarus, Ukraine, and parts of Russia. 

Early in Jamestown's history, Smith and the Virginia Company began recruiting workers from mainland Europe to come to their new colony. The first of these foreign workers came with the second group of settlers who arrived in the colony in 1608; two of these workers would later save Smith's life in an attack by Native Americans  as noted in Smith's writings. Contemporary historical accounts refer to this first group of foreign craftsmen as Dutchmen and Poles.

The foreign craftsmen began producing glassware, pitch, and potash soon after their arrival in 1608. These goods were used in the colony, but were also important as they were the first goods exported from the colony to Europe. Later more skilled workers arrived and continued to produce tar, resin, and turpentine, and clapboard and frankincense as well.

When the first elections in the colony were held in 1619, the colony did not allow any continental settlers to vote, including approximately 50 Polish craftsmen and their families. They were denied the right to vote on the grounds that they were not of English descent. The craftsmen in response, refused to work unless they were given the right to vote. Under this labor pressure, the Virginia Company's Council reversed the decision to disenfranchise the craftsmen, and simultaneously struck an agreement with the craftsmen to apprentice young men from the colony. The company leaders feared not only the loss of income and labor, but that the colony might gain a reputation for not being welcoming to further settlers not of English descent, especially skilled craftsmen.

See also

 Jamestown foreign craftmen

References

Related reading
Generall Historie of Virginia by Captaine John Smith
"Jamestown Colony: A Political, Social, and Cultural History (2007)"

External links
 Craftsmen 1608 Historical Marker (Route 31, Jamestown, Virginia)
 Historic Jamestowne
 Library of Congress: Evolution of the Virginia Colony, 1610-1630

Pre-statehood history of Virginia
Jamestown Polish craftsmen strike
Polish-American culture in Virginia
Polish-American history
1619 in the Thirteen Colonies
Labor disputes in Virginia